Greatest Hits is the third greatest hits album by Tongan-American family band The Jets, released on August 8th, 2004, by K-tel International, Inc. The album is simply a reprint of the 1998 album Then & Now, but with slightly modified title and album cover art. Thus, it isn't a traditional greatest hits album, but rather a compilation of 7 re-recordings, along with 5 newer tracks originally recorded for 𝘛𝘩𝘦𝘯 & 𝘕𝘰𝘸.

Track listing
 "Curiosity" (Jerry Knight, Aaron Zigman) – 4:43
 "Crush on You" (Jerry Knight, Aaron Zigman) – 4:16
 "Make It Real" (Rick Kelly, Linda Mallah, Don Powell) – 4:20
 "Rocket 2 U" (Bobby Nunn) – 4:19
 "Cross My Broken Heart" (Stephen Bray, Tommy Pierce) – 4:08
 "You Got It All" (Rupert Holmes) – 4:22
 "I Do You" (Rick Kelly, Linda Mallah) – 3:37
 "No Time To Lose" (Elizabeth Wolfgramm, Leroy Wolfgramm) - 3:33
 "That's Why God Made the Moon" (John Elefante) – 4:28
 "The Truth" (Cathy Massey, Claire Massey, Mark Jiaras, Mike Chapman, Tommy Gawenda) - 4:02
 "Ooh Baby" (Elizabeth Wolfgramm, Leroy Wolfgramm) - 3:55
 "Sacrifice" (Mike Chapman) - 3:31

The Jets (band) compilation albums
2004 greatest hits albums
K-tel compilation albums